Ana Mirjana Račanović-Jevtić (born Ana Mirjana Račanović, c. 1980) is a Bosnian singer, model and beauty  pageant titleholder who was Miss Bosnia and Herzegovina in 2001 and competed at the Miss World contest of the same year.  Her hometown is Bijeljina, Bosnia and Herzegovina. She is married and living in Rastatt, Baden-Württemberg, Germany with her husband Alen Jevtić.

She was spokesperson for Bosnia and Herzegovina in the Eurovision Song Contest in 2005.

External links
Biography on eurovision.tv 
Photos for Ana Mirjana Račanović at she is crowned Miss Bosnia and Herzegovina in 2001
Interview with Ana Mirjana Račanović
News on Miss BiH
Photos from Miss World 2001

1980s births
Living people
People from Bijeljina
Miss World 2001 delegates
Bosnia and Herzegovina female models
Bosnia and Herzegovina beauty pageant winners
Bosnia and Herzegovina emigrants to Germany
Serb models
Serbs of Bosnia and Herzegovina
Year of birth uncertain